This is a list of members of the Western Australian Legislative Assembly from 1962 to 1965:

Notes
 On 7 May 1962, the Liberal member for Murray, former Premier Sir Ross McLarty, resigned. Liberal candidate Ewart Runciman won the resulting by-election on 23 June 1962.
 At the 1962 state election in Darling Range, Liberal candidate Ken Dunn defeated the sitting Country member Ray Owen. The Labor candidate (Jack Metcalfe) narrowly won the primary vote, whilst Dunn polled one vote ahead of Owen, meaning Owen was eliminated and his votes distributed between Dunn and Metcalfe. A petition was filed and the Court of Disputed Returns ordered a fresh election for 22 July 1962, which widened the gap to 15 votes.
 On 22 July 1962, the Liberal member for Bunbury, George Roberts, died. Liberal candidate Maurice Williams won the resulting by-election on 1 September 1962.

Members of Western Australian parliaments by term